The following is a list of the MTV Europe Music Award winners and nominees for Best Norwegian Act.

1990s

2000s

2010s

New Sounds of Europe 
Norwegian competition

See also 
 MTV Europe Music Award for Best Nordic Act

MTV Europe Music Awards
Norwegian music awards
Awards established in 2005